This is a list of Chinese teas. Chinese tea is a beverage made from the leaves of tea plants  (Camellia sinensis) and – depending on the type of tea – typically 60–100 °C hot water. Tea leaves are processed using traditional Chinese methods. Chinese tea is drunk throughout the day, including during meals, as a substitute for plain water, for health, or for simple pleasure.

Chinese teas

Types

Growing areas

 Cloud tea
 Wuyi tea ("Bohea")

Styles

Infusions

 Chrysanthemum tea
 Gynostemma pentaphyllum
 Kuding

Tea varieties

 24 flavors — herbal
 Anji bai cha — green
 Baihao Yinzhen — white
 Bai Jiguan — oolong
 Bai Mudan — white
 Baimao Hou — green
 Ban Tian Yao — oolong
 Biluochun — green
 Bu Zhi Chun — oolong
 Chun Mee — green
 "Congou" — black
 Da Fang — green
 Da Hong Pao — oolong
 Dianhong — black
 Fo Shou — oolong
 Golden Monkey tea — black
 Huang Guanyin — oolong
 Huang Meigui — oolong
 Huangshan Maofeng — green
 Huoshan Huangya — yellow
 Jin Fo — oolong
 Jin Jun Mei — black
 Jin Suo Chi — oolong
 Junshan Yinzhen — yellow
 Keemun — black
 Lapsang souchong — black
 Longjing tea — green
 Lu'an Melon Seed tea — green
 Mengding Ganlu — green
 Panda dung tea
 Pouchong — green/oolong
 Pu'er — fermented
 Qilan — oolong
 Rougui — oolong
 Ruan Zhi — oolong 
 Shou Mei — white
 Shui Hsien — oolong
 Shui Jin Gui — oolong
 Taiping houkui — green
 Tieluohan — oolong
 Tieguanyin — oolong
 Wong Lo Kat — herbal
 Yingdehong — black
 Zhuyeqing — green

Types of Pu'er 
 Sticky rice pu'er, infused with leaves of Semnostachya menglaensis native to Mengla.
 Banzhang 
 Jingmai 
 Bamboo roasted pu'er 
 Bulang

Ten Famous Teas
Several types of tea have been listed as one of the "Ten Famous Chinese Teas" or "China Famous Teas". 

While no authoritative lists exists per se, teas commonly considered one of the ten include:

See also

 Chinese tea by province (category)
 Chinese tea culture
 Chinese tea classic texts (category)
 History of tea in China
 Lists of beverages

References

External links 
 

Chinese tea
Teas